Felice Riccio (1542–1605) was an Italian painter of the late-Renaissance period, born and mainly active in Verona. He is also known as il Brusasorci or Brusasorzi or Felice Brusasorci. He was the son of the painter Domenico Riccio. He painted a Deposition for the church of Tombazosana in the town of Ronco all'Adige. He painted a canvas for the Sanctuary-Basilica of Santa Maria della Pace in Verona.

Among his pupils were Alessandro Turchi, Pasquale Ottini, Santo Creara, and Marcantonio Bassetti. A number of Riccio's pupils died during the Plague of 1630, including Girolamo Vernigo (dei Paesi), Bartolommeo Farfusola, Ottavo delle Comare, Girolamo Maccacaro, Paolo Zuccaro, Michelangelo Bozzoletta, and Zeno Donato.

Commenting on the events of the plague, Bernasconi states that:
Death, having deserted such beautiful hopes, spread the remaining youth, which went to neighboring cities to learn their art. Some returning to their homeland after 1630, brought new styles, and gave a new direction to painting in Verona, from which it fell to extreme decadence.

References
    
 Dates.

1542 births
1605 deaths
16th-century Italian painters
Italian male painters
17th-century Italian painters
Painters from Verona
Italian Mannerist painters